The 1997 World Indoor Target Archery Championships were held in istanbul, Turkey.

Medal summary (Men's individual)

Medal summary (Women's individual)

Medal summary (Men's team)

Medal summary (Women's team)

References

E
World Indoor Archery Championships
International archery competitions hosted by Turkey
Sport in Istanbul
1997 in Turkish sport
1990s in Istanbul